Linfen West railway station is a railway station of Datong–Xi'an Passenger Railway located in Yaodu District, Linfen, Shanxi, China. It started operation on 1 July 2014, together with the railway.

References 

Railway stations in China opened in 2014
Railway stations in Shanxi